James Purcell is an American actor and filmmaker, who has worked predominantly in Canadian film and television. He is most noted for his starring role as Hector Stone in the television drama series Counterstrike, for which he won the Gemini Award for Best Actor in a Drama Series at the 8th Gemini Awards in 1994.

Originally from Steelton, Pennsylvania, Purcell had his earliest roles in American film and television before moving to Toronto, Ontario after being cast in the television film adaptation of Elmore Leonard's novel Glitz. His other roles have included the films North of Pittsburgh and Sabotage, and supporting or guest appearances in the television series Knots Landing, The Gangster Chronicles, Fame, Cagney & Lacey, Falcon Crest, Riptide, Night Heat, Diamonds, Katts and Dog, 21 Jump Street, Due South, Da Vinci's Inquest, The L Word, Stargate SG-1, The Summit and Murdoch Mysteries.

He directed the 1995 film Fools Die Fast.

References

External links

20th-century American male actors
20th-century Canadian male actors
21st-century American male actors
21st-century Canadian male actors
American male film actors
American male television actors
American expatriate actors in Canada
Canadian male film actors
Canadian male television actors
Best Actor in a Drama Series Canadian Screen Award winners
Male actors from Pennsylvania
People from Dauphin County, Pennsylvania
Living people
Year of birth missing (living people)